Regina Walsh Acres is a provincial electoral district for the Legislative Assembly of Saskatchewan, Canada. Originally created for the 16th Saskatchewan general election in 1967 from parts of Regina North and Regina West, this constituency has changed boundaries many times.

Today this district includes the Regina neighbourhoods of Normanview, Regent Park, Sherwood-McCarthy, McCarthy Park, and Walsh Acres.

This district was called "Regina North West" until 1995, and "Regina Sherwood" from 1995 to 2003.

Members of the Legislative Assembly

Election results

 

|-

|NDP
|Sandra Morin
|align="right"|2,488
|align="right"|39.34
|align="right"|-22.65

 

|-

| style="width: 130px" |NDP
|Sandra Morin
|align="right"|3,942
|align="right"|61.99
|align="right"|-0.86

 

1 Dan Harder, the Saskatchewan Party candidate, withdrew his candidacy on October 27, 2007 after the party learned the details of a complaint of inappropriate conduct made against him by employees of Big Brothers of Regina in 2006 while he was executive director of the organization. See 

| style="width: 130px" |NDP
|Sandra Morin
|align="right"|4,594
|align="right"|62.85

|Independent
|Lindy Kasperski1
|align="right"|192
|align="right"|2.63

1 Lindy Kasperski was suspended from the 24th Assembly's NDP caucus after being charged with fraud.  Following Kasperski's acquittal, he was offered reinstatement – but refused in the face of a difficult re-nomination fight in this constituency.

Regina Sherwood (1995–2003)

|-

| style="width: 130px" |NDP
|Lindy Kasperski
|align="right"|3,090
|align="right"|50.58
|align="right"|-12.69

|Prog. Conservative
|George Marcotte
|align="right"|101
|align="right"|1.65
|align="right"|-5.58

|-

| style="width: 130px" |NDP
|Lindy Kasperski
|align="right"|3,951
|align="right"|63.27

|Prog. Conservative
|Thomas D. Durbin
|align="right"|452
|align="right"|7.24

Regina North West (1967–1995)

|-

|NDP
|Kathie Maher-Wolbaum
|align="right"|1,794
|align="right"|39.88
|align="right"|-20.85

|Prog. Conservative
|Harvey Schmidt
|align="right"|138
|align="right"|3.07
|align="right"|-7.55
|- bgcolor="white"
!align="left" colspan=3|Total
!align="right"|4,498
!align="right"|100.00
!align="right"|

|-

| style="width: 130px" |NDP
|John Solomon
|align="right"|5,660
|align="right"|60.73
|align="right"|+2.46

|Prog. Conservative
|Jack Mock
|align="right"|990
|align="right"|10.62
|align="right"|-22.40
|- bgcolor="white"
!align="left" colspan=3|Total
!align="right"|9,320
!align="right"|100.00
!align="right"|

|-

| style="width: 130px" |NDP
|John Solomon
|align="right"|7,970
|align="right"|58.27
|align="right"|+19.97

|Prog. Conservative
|Alvin Law
|align="right"|4,517
|align="right"|33.02
|align="right"|-24.71

|-

| style="width: 130px" |Prog. Conservative
|Bill Sveinson
|align="right"|6,797
|align="right"|57.73
|align="right"|+36.95

|NDP
|John Solomon
|align="right"|4,509
|align="right"|38.30
|align="right"|-9.44

|-

| style="width: 130px" |NDP
|John Solomon
|align="right"|3,354
|align="right"|47.73
|align="right"|-7.13

|Prog. Conservative
|Philip Lundeen
|align="right"|1,460
|align="right"|20.78
|align="right"|-10.14

|-

| style="width: 130px" |NDP
|Ed Whelan
|align="right"|5,575
|align="right"|54.87
|align="right"|+12.74

|Prog. Conservative
|Philip Lundeen
|align="right"|3,142
|align="right"|30.93
|align="right"|+4.02

|-

| style="width: 130px" |NDP
|Ed Whelan
|align="right"|3,174
|align="right"|42.13
|align="right"|-22.15

|Prog. Conservative
|Bill Sveinson
|align="right"|2,027
|align="right"|26.90
|align="right"|-

|-

| style="width: 130px" |NDP
|Ed Whelan
|align="right"|8,805
|align="right"|64.27
|align="right"|+11.94

|Fred J. Schofield
|align="right"|46
|align="right"|0.34
|align="right"|*

| style="width: 130px" |NDP
|Ed Whelan
|align="right"|5,364
|align="right"|52.33

|Prog. Conservative
|George Tkach
|align="right"|1,011
|align="right"|9.86

References

External links
Website of the Legislative Assembly of Saskatchewan
Saskatchewan Archives Board – Provincial Election Results By Electoral Division
Map of Regina Walsh Acres riding as of 2016

Politics of Regina, Saskatchewan
Saskatchewan provincial electoral districts